Actio personalis moritur cum persona is a Latin expression meaning "a personal right of action dies with the person".

Effect of the maxim 
Some legal causes of action can survive the death of the claimant or plaintiff, for example actions founded in contract law.  However, some actions are personal to the plaintiff, defamation of character being one notable example.  Therefore, such an action, where it relates to the private character of the plaintiff, comes to an end on his death, whereas an action for the publication of a false and malicious statement which causes damage to the plaintiff's personal estate will survive to the benefit of his or her personal representatives.

The principle also exists to protect the estate and executors from liability for strictly personal acts of the deceased, such as charges for fraud.

Origins of the maxim
It has been argued by academics and acknowledged by the courts that notwithstanding the Latinate form in which the proposition is expressed its origins are less antiquated. It has been described by one Lord Chancellor (Viscount Simon) as:

...not in fact the source from which a body of law has been deduced, but a confusing expression, framed in the solemnity of the Latin tongue, in which the effect of death upon certain personal torts was inaccurately generalised.

The maxim is first quoted in a case from 1496, where a woman against whom a defamation judgment was issued died before paying the damages to the tortfeasor.

The Kings Bench first used the maxim in Cleymond v Vincent (1523) but it was popularized by Edward Coke, with cases like Pinchons Case (1616),  and Bane's Case, and to some extent with Slades Case. (1605)

Judicial discussions of the term followed Pinchon's case in Hambly v. Trott. and later Phillips v Homfray.

See also 
 List of Latin phrases

References 

Latin legal terminology